Djorgovski 1 is a globular cluster discovered in 1986 by George Djorgovski who was looking for possible obscured globular clusters using the IRAS Point Source Catalog. Studies show that its stars are "metal-poor" - they contain hydrogen and helium but little else. Djorgovski 1 is actually one of the most metal-poor clusters in the inner galaxy.

References

Globular clusters
Scorpius (constellation)